This is a list of County Correctional facilities in the Commonwealth of Massachusetts. It does not include federal prisons or state prisons located in Massachusetts. Each of the following houses of correction and jails are under the jurisdiction of the Sheriff of that county.

References

External links 
 Barnstable County Correctional Facility
 Berkshire County Jail and House of Correction
 Bristol County House Of Correction and Jail
 Dukes County Jail and House of Correction
 Essex County Correctional Facility
 Franklin County Jail and House of Correction
 Hampden County Jail and House of Correction
 Hampshire County Jail and House of Correction
 Middlesex County Jail & House of Correction
 Nantucket County Jail
 Nashua Street Jail (Suffolk Cty)
 Norfolk County Correctional Center
 Plymouth County Correctional Facility
 South Bay House of Correction (Suffolk Cty)
 Worcester County Jail and House of Correction

Correctional facilities
Prisons in Massachusetts